José Maurer (born 21 October 1951) is a Mexican equestrian. He competed in two events at the 1992 Summer Olympics.

References

1951 births
Living people
Mexican male equestrians
Olympic equestrians of Mexico
Equestrians at the 1992 Summer Olympics
Place of birth missing (living people)